Coulée-des-Adolphe is an unorganized territory in the Gaspésie–Îles-de-la-Madeleine region of Quebec, Canada.

It is named after a small ravine found in the centre of the territory (coulée is an archaic French word meaning "small canal" or "channel"). The ravine is formed by the Adolphe Creek, a tributary of the Little Cap-Chat River, that was named in honour of Adolphe Gagnon or one of the sons of this former inhabitant.

Demographics

Population

See also
 List of unorganized territories in Quebec

References

Unorganized territories in Gaspésie-Îles-de-la-Madeleine